Fort Gibson Public School is located in the small town of Fort Gibson, Oklahoma. The school mascot is the tiger.

Alumni
Teddy Lehman attended Fort Gibson High School and graduated in 2000.

School shooting
On December 6, 1999, 13-year-old middle school student Seth Trickey shot four classmates with a Taurus PT92. 12-year-old Savana Knowles, was shot near her right ear, the slug exited without hitting vital organs. 13-year-old Billy Railey, was shot in his right leg. 13-year-olds Cody Chronister and Brad Schindel were also wounded. Another student received slight bruising. The victims were taken to area hospitals, there were no fatalities.

References

External links

Public high schools in Oklahoma
Schools in Muskogee County, Oklahoma
Public middle schools in Oklahoma
Public elementary schools in Oklahoma